The 2010 Sudan Premier League was the 39th edition of the highest club level football competition in Sudan. The competition started on 2010-02-20.
For the 2010 season, the number of teams has been expanded from 13 to 14 teams. Al-Hilal Omdurman are the defending champions.

Team information

Standings
The last game of the first round is on Saturday May 16 before the mid-season break, after which the league resumed play with the 14th week/round on July 19.

External links
 FIFA.com - Sudan: - League table
 http://www.goalzz.com/main.aspx?c=5711

Sudan Premier League seasons
Sudan
Sudan
football